Nogometni klub Drava Ptuj, commonly referred to as NK Drava Ptuj or simply Drava, was a Slovenian football club, which played in the town of Ptuj. Named after the Drava river which flows through the town, Drava Ptuj has spent a total of seven season in the Slovenian PrvaLiga, the top division of the Slovenian football pyramid. The club was dissolved following the 2010–11 Slovenian Second League when they were unable to obtain competition licences issued by the Football Association of Slovenia.

In 2004, the club founded NŠ Drava Ptuj, which was to be responsible for the club's youth selections. However, the track records and honours of the two clubs are kept separate by the Football Association of Slovenia.

Domestic league and cup results

Honours
Slovenian Second League
Runners-up (2): 1996–97, 2002–03

Slovenian Third League
Winners (2): 1993–94, 2000–01

Slovenian Fourth Division
Winners (1): 1992–93

MNZ Ptuj Cup
Winners (4): 1992–93, 1995–96, 1997–98, 1998–99
Runners-up (4): 1993, 1994–95, 2002–03, 2010–11

UEFA competitions
Drava goals always listed first.

References

Football clubs in Yugoslavia
Defunct football clubs in Slovenia
Association football clubs established in 1933
1933 establishments in Slovenia
Association football clubs disestablished in 2011
2011 disestablishments in Slovenia